Lo Último de Mecano (English: Mecano's Latest) is a compilation album by the Spanish band Mecano.

Lo Último de Mecano was released by Mecano's former record label CBS in 1986, to capitalise on the renewed popularity the band had achieved with their first studio album for BMG Ariola, Entre el cielo y el suelo.

The album includes four previously released B-sides and four live songs recorded in Segovia during the Ya Viene el Sol tour.  The four b-sides were later included in another CBS low-budget compilation titled Hoy no me puedo levantar y otros grandes exitos. "Viaje Espacial" was also featured as bonus tracks on the 2005 re-release of ¿Dónde está el país de las hadas? and on the 'Extras' CD in the Obras Completas box set. The live tracks are not available elsewhere.

Lo Último de Mecano is the only Mecano album that was not re-released in 1998, making the CD edition particularly rare.

Track listing
Tracks:
 La Extraña Posición (B-side to No pintamos nada, 1984)
 Napoleón (B-side to Maquillaje, 1982)
 Viaje Espacial (B-side to Perdido en mi habitacion, 1982)
 Super Ratón (B-side to Maquillaje, 1982)
 No Pintamos Nada (Live)
 La Fiesta Nacional (Live)
 Busco Algo Barato (Live)
 Me Rio de Janeiro (Live)

Arrangements
 Songs 1, 5, 6, 7 y 8 by Mecano
 Songs 2, 3 y 4 by Luis Cobos

References

1986 debut albums
Mecano albums